True Stories is a collection of poetry by Canadian author Margaret Atwood, published in 1981. The collection is dedicated to poet Carolyn Forché with whom Atwood had discussed her trip to El Salvador as a member of Amnesty International, and the poems both directly and indirectly discuss her views regarding human rights in third-world nations.

The poems of True Stories confront the nature of poetry, question whether they may be conventionally defined as poetry. They diverge from the themes established in her previous poetry; they explore themes of atrocity, of war and torture. Ultimately, they confront whether “poems come from such horrors?”.

Notes

External links

1981 poetry books
Poetry by Margaret Atwood
Canadian poetry collections
Oxford University Press books